BA2 may refer to:

 A postcode district in the BA postcode area, England
 Brain Age 2: More Training in Minutes a Day!, a game
 Band Aid (band)
 Lineage BA.2, a variant of the Omicron strain of SARS-CoV-2 that causes COVID-19

See also

 
 BA (disambiguation)
 BAA (disambiguation)
 Baba (disambiguation)
 B2A (disambiguation)
 2BA